Los Medallistas is a Colombian drama television series produced Caracol Televisión that premiered on 8 February 2023. The show is produced by Juan Carlos Villamizar, and directed by Luis Orjuela, Juan Carlos Vásquez, and Mónica Cifuentes. The series is based on real events about the lives of three athletes who achieved Olympic Glory. It stars the Venezuelan actor José Ramón Barreto, and Colombian actress Paola Valencia, and Mayra Luna.

Plot 
The series follows the lives, struggles and achievements of Yuri Alvear (Mayra Luna), Ingrit Valencia (Paola Valencia) and Óscar Muñoz (José Ramón Barreto), three Olympic medalists born in different regions of Colombia and from families of limited economic resources.

Cast 
 José Ramón Barreto as Óscar Muñoz
 Paola Valencia as Ingrit Valencia
 Mayra Luna as Yuri Alvear
 Víctor Hugo Trespalacios
 Yeimy Paola Vargas
 Julio Pachón
 Indhira Serrano as Gabriela Valencia
 Nancy Murillo
 Leo Sosa Fuentes
 Karoll Márquez
 Gary Forero
 Dubán Prado
 Diana Herrera
 Felipe Londoño as Wilson Muñoz

Production 
The production of the series revolves around the 2020 Summer Olympics, and was confirmed on 15 October 2019. Filming of the series concluded on 21 December 2019.

Ratings

Episodes

References

External links 
 

2023 telenovelas
2023 Colombian television series debuts
Colombian telenovelas
Caracol Televisión telenovelas
Spanish-language telenovelas